Dinmael was a medieval lordship and cwmwd in north Wales which usually formed a part of the patrimony of the kingdom of Powys. The name, of Old Welsh origin, means "the King's Fort" (Din "fort" + Mael "king") and probably refers to a now forgotten early Welsh fortress.

The name survives in the name of a village in the modern county of Conwy; however the modern village is much smaller than the medieval lordship.

Notes

References

Llangwm, Conwy
History of Conwy County Borough
Cantrefs